Lichtensteinia may refer to:
 Lichtensteinia (plant), a genus of plants in the family Apiaceae
 Lichtensteinia, a genus of plants in the family Loranthaceae, synonym of Tapinanthus
 Lichtensteinia, a genus of true bugs in the family Coccidae, synonym of Lichtensia